Julie Ellen Nimoy (born March 21, 1955) is an American film producer and director. Nimoy is the daughter of actors Leonard Nimoy and Sandra Zober.

Early life
Julie Nimoy was born in Atlanta while her father was stationed at Fort McPherson and grew up near Century City and in Westwood. She attended University High School.  Nimoy shared in her father's interests, including flying and photography. She took flying lessons in order to back him up in his single-engine Piper and learned to work in his home darkroom. She would also travel with her father while he was working and would eventually work behind the scenes on some of his productions, including his one-man show, Vincent and In Search of....  Nimoy attended the University of California, Santa Barbara and graduated with a degree in fine arts.

Career
After college, Nimoy interned briefly as a geriatric art therapist and occupational therapist. She subsequently decided to pursue a career in television and film production, landing production jobs with such companies as Alan Landsburg Productions and Merv Griffin Productions. She also spent time shadowing her father and others, including the second and third assistant directors on Star Trek II: The Wrath of Khan.

Her credits include Deadly Games; Microwarriors: The Origin and the Destiny, about probiotics and directed by her brother, Adam Nimoy; and Unexplained Bleeding: Shedding Light on Acquired Hemophilia A. Nimoy also appeared in one of series of Oldsmobile commercials with her father, who directed the commercial.

In her 50s, Nimoy graduated from Le Cordon Bleu culinary school, in Pasadena, California. She then ran a catering service and worked as a baker in a restaurant.

Remembering Leonard Nimoy

In 2014, Leonard Nimoy became and advocate and activist for COPD awareness and prevention by posting on social media about the dangers of smoking. Julie Nimoy, wanting to support his efforts, collaborated with her husband, filmmaker David Knight, and began production on a documentary tentatively titled,  COPD: Highly Illogical- A Special Tribute to Leonard Nimoy. After Leonard Nimoy's death in 2015, the focus of the film was expanded to also serve as a remembrance of his life and retitled, Remembering Leonard Nimoy.

Other projects

Nimoy and Knight collaborated with the Centers for Disease Control and Prevention on their annual smoking cessation campaign called, "Tips from Former Smokers" by featuring Leonard Nimoy's Story. The campaign also includes print ads, national TV commercials and social media. Since 2021, Nimoy and Knight have partnered with L.A. Care Health Plan on a billboard and social media campaign encouraging the public to get vaccinated and boosted. 

As of January 2023, Nimoy and Knight are in post-production on a film tribute to Gene Wilder, to celebrate his life and to bring awareness to Alzheimer's disease.

External links
 The Nimoy Knight Foundation
 Oldsmobile commercial with Julie and Leonard Nimoy
 CDC Tips from Former Smokers

References

1955 births
Living people
American film producers
American documentary film producers
American women film producers
Film producers from California
American women documentary filmmakers
American people of Ukrainian-Jewish descent
Leonard Nimoy
University High School (Los Angeles) alumni
University of California, Santa Barbara alumni
Alumni of Le Cordon Bleu
People from Los Angeles
People from Westwood, Los Angeles